Etoxazole is a narrow spectrum systemic acaricide used to combat spider mites. It targets a variety of mites in the egg, larvae and nymph stages however not the adult stage. It also exhibits insecticidal activity towards aphids, the green rice leafhopper and diamondback moth. The mode of action was originally suspected to inhibit the molting process but has since been shown to inhibit chitin synthesis.  Resistance due to its high efficacy and cross resistance when used with other acaricides are both of concern similar to was seen in the fast development of cross resistance in the previous generation of acaricides. The LC50 for resistant mite strains has been observed over 100,000 times greater than that of susceptible strains. Thus resistance management strategies are important in order to limit the increase of etoxazole resistant mite strains.

Etoxazole has a mammalian toxicity LD50 of 5 g/kg and an environmental persistence DT50 of 19 days. Toxicity towards fish is of potential concern.

Etoxazole was discovered in the 1980s by Yashima and was released for commercial use in 1998 in Japan. It is sold under various commercial preparations for crop application such as TetraSan 5 WDG and Zeal by Valent in the United States.

Stereoisomerism

References

External links

Acaricides
Fluoroarenes
Tert-butyl compounds